Stavetown is an unincorporated community in Brookville Township, Franklin County, Indiana.

History
Stavetown received its name from a stave factory once located there. The stave factory was destroyed in the Great Flood of 1913 and was not rebuilt.

Geography

References

Unincorporated communities in Franklin County, Indiana
Unincorporated communities in Indiana